The Foreign Correspondents' Club of Thailand (FCCT) was founded in the 1957 in Bangkok's Patpong area. It is considered the oldest and largest press club in Southeast Asia. After the Vietnam War ended in 1975, Laos, Cambodia, and Vietnam were mostly inaccessible for foreign journalists, leading to FCCT becoming a regional hub for journalism. Today, the FCCT hosts exhibitions for photojournalism and contemporary arts.

References 

Foreign correspondents' clubs